Jesse Olds Norton (December 25, 1812 – August 3, 1875) was a U.S. Representative from Illinois.

Biography
Born in Bennington, Vermont, Norton attended Bennington Academy and was graduated from Williams College, Williamstown, Massachusetts, in 1835. Norton was a charter member of The Kappa Alpha Society and was awarded membership in Phi Beta Kappa. For four years he taught high school in Virginia and Missouri and then moved to Illinois where he studied law. He was admitted to the bar in 1840 and began practice in Joliet. Norton was a Probate Judge in 1846. He served as member of the state constitutional convention in 1847 and served as member of the Illinois House of Representatives in 1851 and 1852.

Norton was elected as a Whig to the Thirty-third Congress and reelected as an Opposition Party candidate to the Thirty-fourth Congress (March 4, 1853 – March 3, 1857). He was not a candidate for renomination in 1856. He served as judge of the eleventh judicial district of Illinois 1857-1862.

Norton was elected as a Republican to the Thirty-eighth Congress (March 4, 1863 – March 3, 1865). He was not a candidate for renomination in 1864. He served as delegate to the Union National Convention at Philadelphia in 1866. He resumed the practice of his profession and was United States Attorney for Northern Illinois from 1866 to 1869. He died in Chicago, Illinois, August 3, 1875, and was interred in Oakwood Cemetery in Joliet.

References

1812 births
1875 deaths
People from Bennington, Vermont
Illinois Whigs
Whig Party members of the United States House of Representatives
Opposition Party members of the United States House of Representatives from Illinois
Republican Party members of the United States House of Representatives from Illinois
Members of the Illinois House of Representatives
Illinois state court judges
People from Joliet, Illinois
19th-century American politicians
19th-century American judges